The SNCF TGV Réseau (TGV-R) trains were built by Alstom between 1992 and 1996. These TGV trainsets are based on the earlier TGV Atlantique.

The first Réseau ("Network") sets entered service in 1993. Fifty dual-voltage trainsets were built in 1992-1994, numbered 501-550. A further 40 triple-voltage trainsets, numbered 4501-4540, were built in 1994-1996. The last ten of these triple voltage units carry the Thalys livery and are known as Thalys PBA (Paris-Brussels-Amsterdam) sets. As well as using standard French voltages of 25 kV AC and 1,500 V DC (also used in the Netherlands), the triple voltage sets can operate under the Belgian and Italian 3 kV DC supplies.

They are formed of two power cars ( under 25 kV—like the TGV Atlantique) and eight carriages, giving a capacity of 377 seats. Owing to early complaints of uncomfortable pressure changes when entering tunnels at high speed on the LGV Atlantique, the Réseau sets are pressure-sealed.

In 2006 the carriages of nineteen sets were used to form TGV POS sets by using new TGV POS motorcars for services on the LGV Est to Germany and Switzerland. The 38 replaced Réseau motorcars were slightly modified and joined to new Duplex carriages, forming nineteen TGV Réseau Duplex units. They now operate as  part of the TGV Duplex fleet, being numbered 601-619.

Renovation
After some ten years of successful service, the interior of TGV Réseau sets became outdated and needed a refurbishment. This refurbishment was part of the TGV Est project, as the dual-voltage sets were to assure the domestic services there. The same interiors would also be used in the coaches for POS sets.

Three possible interiors were presented to the public between 2002 and 2003 in different stations:
Recaro which teamed up with Brand Company (designer of the "snail" TGV logo)
MBD Design (designer of the noses of Alstom's Prima locomotives and the TGV Duplex) which teamed up with fashion designer Christian Lacroix.
Antolin which teamed up with Kenzo.

At the end of the Train Capitale exposition in Paris, MBD Design and Christian Lacroix were announced as the winning design.

Work started on the first dual-voltage sets in 2004 at SNCF's Hellemmes workshops, near Lille. In 2006 the last dual-voltage set was finished. Between 2008 and 2009 the three-voltage sets will also be refurbished in the same design. The refurbished sets can be distinguished from the non-refurbished ones by: the slightly changed livery; the fittings in the coaches, which are in new colours (red for 2nd class, yellow-green for 1st class and silver for the bar) and the reflecting stripes on the sides of the motorcars.

Fleet details

Gallery

See also
 List of high speed trains
 KTX-I — derived design used in Korea

External links

SNCF TGV-R profile on Trainspo

Reseau
Train-related introductions in 1993

de:Train à grande vitesse#TGV Réseau
Electric multiple units with locomotive-like power cars
25 kV AC multiple units
3000 V DC multiple units
Alstom high-speed trains
1500 V DC multiple units of France